The Palace of Dimitrie Cantemir (Romanian: Palatul lui Dimitrie Cantemir; Turkish: Dimitri Kantemir Saray) was a palace owned by the Prince of Moldavia Dimitrie Cantemir in Istanbul, located on the grounds of the present-day Ortaköy Mosque.

History
The structure, located along the pier that nowadays hosts the Ortaköy Mosque, was bought by Cantemir sometimes immediately after 1683 (the Battle of Vienna) from a brother of the Grand Vizier, and expanded in 1690-1691 and 1693–1694. A depiction of the palace made by Cantemir himself is found in Nicolas Tindal's translation of his work  History of the Growth and Decay of the Ottoman Empire.

See also 
 Bogdan Saray
 Ottoman architecture

Literature 
 Liviu Brătuleani. Monumente uitate. Reşedinţa lui Dimitrie Cantemir din Istanbul .

Ottoman palaces in Istanbul
Bosphorus
Dimitrie Cantemir
History of Moldavia (1504–1711)
Beşiktaş
Former buildings and structures in Turkey